Jilliby is a large non-metropolitan suburb located in the Dooralong Valley of the Central Coast region of New South Wales, Australia. It is part of the  local government area.

Population
In the 2016 Census there were 1,646 people in Jilliby. 83.1% of people were born in Australia and 91.2% of people spoke only English at home. The most common responses for religion were Catholic 25.7%, Anglican 24.2% and No Religion 22.9%.

References

Suburbs of the Central Coast (New South Wales)